Izvir is a small settlement in the Municipality of Brežice in eastern Slovenia. It lies in the Gorjanci Hills close to the border with Croatia. The area is part of the traditional region of Lower Carniola. It is now included in the Lower Sava Statistical Region.

The name Izvir means 'spring' or 'source of water' in Slovene. Chance finds of Roman clay piping and archaeological excavations in the 1930s revealed a now-reconstructed water cistern at the source of a stream and a Roman aqueduct supplying water to the nearby settlement of Neviodunum.

References

External links
Izvir on Geopedia

Populated places in the Municipality of Brežice